Tournemire may refer to:

 Tournemire, Aveyron, France, a commune
 Tournemire, Cantal, France, a commune
 Charles Tournemire (1870-1939), French composer and organist
 Evgenia Tur (1815-1892), married name Countess Elizaveta Vasilyevna Salias De Tournemire, Russian writer, critic, journalist and publisher
 Guillaume de Tournemire (1901–1970), French modern pentathlete